Whose Line is it Anyway? Australia (also known as Whose Line? and Whose Line? Oz) is a 10-part Australian improvisational comedy show, based on the British show of the same name, hosted by Tommy Little on Foxtel network's The Comedy Channel, premiering on 27 November 2016.

There are seven cast members throughout the series, with four performing each episode, using the same basic formula as the other versions of the show. The ensemble cast include Rhys Darby, Cal Wilson, Tegan Higginbotham, Susie Youssef, Steen Raskopoulos, Bridie Connell and Tom Walker.

On 10 November 2016, before the show's premiere, host Tommy Little jokingly announced a second season at a Melbourne-based media event without the permission from Foxtel executives. At the time the show had not gotten a formal renewal.

List of games

Episodes

References

2016 Australian television series debuts
Australian comedy television series
The Comedy Channel original programming
Australian television series based on British television series
Improvisational television series